The 1994–95 season was Galatasaray's 91st in existence and the 37th consecutive season in the 1. Lig. This article shows statistics of the club's players in the season, and also lists all matches that the club have played in the season.

Squad statistics

Players in / out

In

Out

1. Lig

Standings

Matches

Türkiye Kupası
Kick-off listed in local time (EET)

6th round

1/4 final

1/2 final

Final

UEFA Champions League

Qualifying round

Group stage

Başbakanlık Kupası
Kick-off listed in local time (EET)

Friendly Matches
Kick-off listed in local time (EET)

TSYD Kupası

Türkiye Mehmetçikle El Ele Turnuvası

Attendance

References

 Tuncay, Bülent (2002). Galatasaray Tarihi. Yapı Kredi Yayınları

External links
 Galatasaray Sports Club Official Website 
 Turkish Football Federation – Galatasaray A.Ş. 
 uefa.com – Galatasaray AŞ

Galatasaray S.K. (football) seasons
Turkish football clubs 1994–95 season
1990s in Istanbul
Galatasaray Sports Club 1994–95 season